Hawkridge may refer to two places in England:

 Hawkridge, Somerset
 Hawkridge, Chittlehampton, North Devon

See also 
 Hawkeridge, Wiltshire